(died 29 July 2020) was a Japanese music composer. He composed the opening theme songs for Utawarerumono and Asatte no Houkou which were both sung by Suara.

References

External links
 

20th-century births
2020 deaths
Year of birth missing
Anime composers
Japanese composers
Place of death missing
Place of birth missing